Salgueira Beach (Praia da Salgueira in Portuguese) is an extensive maritime beach of the city Póvoa de Varzim in Portugal. The beach has white sand and very few rocks, in the central spot with a northern rocky side, near Buddha Club, known as Praia Azul (Blue Beach). Salgueira is very popular in the summer, with less crowds during weekdays or out of the summer season. 

Salgueira is crossed by Banhos Avenue, Póvoa's main waterfront avenue. The beach took the name of a former district and is a classic surfing beach (Póvoa de Varzim spot), very popular amongst bodyboarders, as the waves in the spot are more suitable for bodyboard, but with the high tide it will be good to longboard and surf, suitable for experienced surfers. In earlier times, the local surfer community barely allowed outsiders or beginners to surf in this spot, currently it is open for almost everyone.

The southern tip of the beach is known as Carvalhido near Esplanada do Carvalhido — a beach-square, while the northern tip, near Buddah Club, is known as Praia Azul (blue Beach).

Beaches of Póvoa de Varzim